The House Intelligence Subcommittee on Defense Intelligence and Overhead Architecture is one of the four subcommittees within the Permanent Select Committee on Intelligence. During to the 117th Congress, it was known as the Subcommittee on Department of Defense Intelligence and Warfighter Support.

Members, 118th Congress

Members, 117th Congress

References

External links 
 House Intelligence Committee Website

Intelligence Department of Defense, Intelligence and Overhead Architecture